Tiddas may refer to: 
Tiddas (band), Australian female folk band trio
 Tiddas (album), 1996 album by the band
Tiddas (commune), a commune in Morocco
Tiddas (novel), 2014 novel by Dr Anita Heiss
Plural of Tidda, Northern Koori usage (Australian Aboriginal pidgin) meaning "sister"